The Trans-Hudson orogeny or Trans-Hudsonian orogeny was the major mountain building event (orogeny) that formed the Precambrian Canadian Shield and the North American Craton (also called Laurentia), forging the initial North American continent. It gave rise to the Trans-Hudson orogen (THO), or Trans-Hudson Orogen Transect (THOT), (also referred to as the Trans-Hudsonian Suture Zone (THSZ) or Trans-Hudson suture) which is the largest Paleoproterozoic orogenic belt in the world. It consists of a network of belts that were formed by Proterozoic crustal accretion and the collision of pre-existing Archean continents. The event occurred 2.0–1.8 billion years ago.

The Trans-Hudson orogen sutured together the Hearne-Rae, Superior, and Wyoming cratons to form the cratonic core of North America in a network of Paleoproterozoic orogenic belts. These orogenic belts include the margins of at least nine independent microcontinents that were themselves sections of at least three former major supercontinents, including Laurasia, Pangaea and Kenorland (ca. 2.7 Ga), and contain parts of some of the oldest cratonic continental crust on Earth.  These old cratonic blocks, along with accreted island arc terranes and intraoceanic deposits from earlier Proterozoic and Mesozoic oceans and seaways, were sutured together in the Trans-Hudson Orogen (THO) and resulted in extensive folding and thrust faulting along with metamorphism and hundreds of huge granitic intrusions.

The THO is a right-angled suture zone that extends eastward from Saskatchewan through collisional belts in the Churchill province, through  northern Quebec, parts of Labrador and Baffin Island, and all the way to Greenland as the Rinkian belt and Nagssugtodidian Orogen. Westward it goes across Hudson Bay through Saskatchewan and then extends 90 degrees south through eastern Montana and the western Dakotas, downward through eastern Wyoming and western Nebraska, and is then cut off by the Cheyenne belt - the northern edge of the Yavapai province (see Trans-Hudson Orogen map and the THOT Transect map. To the south, the orogen contributed to the subsurface Phanerozoic strata in Montana and the Dakotas that created the Great Plains.

Overview
The Trans-Hudson orogeny was the culminating event of the Paleoproterozoic Laurentian assembly, which occurred after the Wopmay orogeny (West of Hudson Bay, ca. 2.1-1.9 Ga.).  The Trans-Hudson orogeny resulted from the collision of the Superior Craton of eastern Canada with the Hearne Craton in northern Saskatchewan and the Wyoming Craton of the western United States, with the Archean microcontinent Sask Craton trapped in the THO western interior. Similar to the Himalayas, the Trans-Hudson orogeny was also the result of continent-continent collision along a suture zone.  Only the roots of this mountain chain remain, but these can be seen in northeastern Saskatchewan and in the Black Hills of South Dakota.  The Trans-Hudson orogeny and the consequent upheaval of the continental crust in the middle Proterozoic eon caused the area around the Great Lakes to become a flattened plain, which in turn led to the creation of the intracontinental basin and the interior and central plains of the United States (the Great Plains are the westernmost portion of North America's Interior Plains, which extend east to the Appalachian Plateau).

The Black Hills of South Dakota is one of the few remaining exposed portions of the Trans-Hudson orogenic belt. The peaks of the Black Hills are 3,000 to 4,000 feet above the surrounding plains, while Black Elk Peak - the highest point in South Dakota - has an altitude of 7,242 feet above sea level.  These central spires and peaks all are carved from granite and other igneous and metamorphic rocks that form the core of the uplift. The nature and timing of this portion of the THO event in southern Laurentia is poorly understood, when compared to the exposed northern segments in Canada. The Black Hills offer the only surface exposure of the deformed and metamorphosed belt of Paleoproterozoic continental margin rocks in the collisional zone between the Archean Wyoming and Superior provinces. Based on geophysical evidence, this zone has been broadly interpreted to be the southern extension of the THO that was later truncated by the ~1.680 Ga. Central Plains orogen.

Sequence of events
Marine evidence indicates that the area initially opened to form an ocean called the Manikewan Ocean. Faulting, sedimentary and igneous rocks all indicate that divergence formed a rift valley that continued to spread until it resulted in a passive margin in which there was no tectonic activity. Shallow marine deposits formed on the continental shelves, and oceanic crust formed on the margins of the continental cratons as the divergence continued. Eventually the divergence stopped, then reversed direction, and collision occurred between continental land masses. During the Wopmay orogeny, subduction occurred as oceanic crust of the Slave Craton was subducted beneath an eastward moving continental plate. Likewise, during the Trans-Hudson orogeny, rifting at first separated the Superior craton from the rest of the continent. Then the Superior Craton reversed its direction and the ocean basin began to close. A subduction zone formed as the oceanic crust of the Superior Craton was subducted beneath the Hearne and Wyoming Craton with the Sask Craton in the middle. Volcanic arcs developed as the cratons collided, eventually resulting in the THO mountain building (orogeny).

Northwestern hinterland zone
The Northwestern hinterland zone is a complex tectonically deformed region that includes the Peter Lake, Wollaston, and Seal River domains, and other parts of the Cree Lake Zone, now included in Hearne Province.

Reindeer zone
The Reindeer zone to the north is a 500 km wide collage of Paleoproterozoic (1.92-1.83 Ga) arc volcanic rocks, plutons, volcanogenic sediments, and younger molasse, divisible into several lithostructural domains. Most of these rocks evolved in an oceanic to transitional, subduction-related arc setting, with increasing influence of Archean crustal components to the northwest. The zone overlies Archean basement exposed in structural windows that are now recognized as the Sask craton.

Wathaman-Chipewyan batholith
The Wathaman-Chipewyan batholith is an Andean-type continental-margin, magmatic arc emplaced 1.86-1.85 Ga.

Flin Flon domain
The Flin Flon domain is in the center of the Trans-Hudson Suture Zone and extends over the border of the Manitoba-Saskatchewan segment east and west.  It is west of the Superior Craton, south of the Kisseynew Domain, and east of the Glennie Domain.

Superior Boundary zone
The Superior Boundary zone is a narrow, southeastern, ensialic foreland zone bordering Superior Craton, comprising the Thompson Belt, Split Lake Block, and Fox River Belt.

Economic geology
The Flin Flon greenstone belt is one of the largest Proterozoic volcanic-hosted massive sulfide (VMS) districts in the world, containing 27 Cu-Zn- (Au) deposits from which more than 183 million tonnes of ore have been mined. Most of mined VMS deposits in the Flin Flon belt are associated with juvenile arc volcanic rocks providing a powerful focus for future explorations. Gold mineralization has been less studied, but at Reed Lake has been shown to be associated with late brittle-ductile shear zones that follow peak tectonic and metamorphic activity within the Trans-Hudson Orogen. At Snow Lake, preliminary investigations suggest a long history of gold mineralization with at least some gold introduced prior to metamorphism.

See also
 Labrador Trough

References

 Trans-Hudsonian Suture--Collision of Superior with Hearne/Wyoming Province
 John B. Brady, et al., eds. (2004) Precambrian Geology of the Tobacco Root Mountains, Montana (Special Papers (Geological Society of America), 377.) 
 LITHOPROBE Seismic Processing Facility (LSPF). (1990). "Phase V Proposal - Executive Overview: Trans-Hudson Orogen Transect (THOT).    
 LITHOPROBE Seismic Processing Facility (LSPF). (1998). "Trans-Hudson Orogen Transect." 

Orogenies of North America
Paleoproterozoic orogenies
Precambrian Canada
Precambrian United States
Geology of North America
Geology of Manitoba
Geology of Montana
Geology of Nebraska
Geology of North Dakota
Geology of Saskatchewan
Geology of South Dakota
Geology of Wyoming
Black Hills
Historical geology
Precambrian North America